World Series of Fighting 10: Branch vs. Taylor was a mixed martial arts event that took place on June 21, 2014 at the Hard Rock Hotel & Casino in Las Vegas, Nevada, United States.

Background
The event was originally planned to take place at the Event Center Arena on the campus of San Jose State University.  However, the organization announced the change in location and venue on April 18, 2014.

This event featured the finals of the WSOF Middleweight Championship tournament between David Branch and Jesse Taylor.

Georgi Karakhanyan made his first title defense at this event as he took on Rick Glenn.

Lynn Alvarez and Sofia Bagherdai were expected to fight at the event but the bout was cancelled after an injury to Bagherdai.

Results

Tournament bracket

See also 
 World Series of Fighting
 List of WSOF champions
 List of WSOF events

References

World Series of Fighting events
2014 in mixed martial arts
Mixed martial arts in Las Vegas
Hard Rock Hotel and Casino (Las Vegas)